E572 may refer to:
Calcium stearate
Magnesium stearate
European route E572, a route in Slovakia